Talaiasi Labalaba BEM (13 July 1942 – 19 July 1972) was a British-Fijian sergeant in the SAS who was involved in the Battle of Mirbat on 19 July 1972. Labalaba initially served in the British Army in the Royal Ulster Rifles.

Battle of Mirbat

On 19 July 1972 the Popular Front for the Liberation of the Occupied Arabian Gulf (PFLOAG) attacked the British Army Training Team (BATT) house, which housed the nine SAS soldiers, based just outside the port of Mirbat, Oman.

Labalaba, aged 30, was shot dead in the neck whilst firing a 25-pounder gun at the attacking guerrilla forces.

He displayed notable bravery by continuing to fire the 25 pounder single handed in spite of being seriously wounded when a bullet hit him on the face, after his Omani loader was seriously wounded early in the battle. Captain Mike Kealy and fellow troopers Tommy Tobin and Sekonaia Takavesi ran a gauntlet of enemy fire but arrived too late to save Labalaba. Both the troopers were also hit, Takavesi was wounded in the shoulder, head, and stomach while Tobin was killed when a round crept through the sand-bagged walls and hit him in the face. Labalaba's actions helped to keep the insurgents pinned down until Strikemaster jets of the SOAF arrived to drive back the attackers while reinforcements from Salalah could be organised.

Fellow SAS trooper Roger Cole in his book of the battle, SAS: Operation Storm, paid tribute to Labalaba saying if the guerrilla force had taken the 25-pounder then the SAS would have surely lost the battle.

Honours

Labalaba was awarded a posthumous Mention in Despatches for his actions in the Battle of Mirbat, although some of his former comrades have campaigned for him to be awarded a posthumous Victoria Cross. His body was returned to England and buried in the cemetery at St Martin's Church, Hereford.

In 2012 he was chosen as one of BBC Radio 4's 60 New Elizabethans in celebration of Queen Elizabeth's Diamond Jubilee.

A statue of Labalaba was erected in 2009 at the SAS headquarters in Herefordshire, and another,  at Nadi International Airport in Fiji, dedicated in 2018 during a visit by the Duke and Duchess of Sussex.

Footnotes

References

 BBC News Article

1942 births
1972 deaths
British military personnel killed in action
British military personnel of the Aden Emergency
British military personnel of the Dhofar Rebellion
Recipients of the British Empire Medal
Royal Ulster Rifles soldiers
Special Air Service soldiers
Royal Irish Rangers soldiers